The Honolulu Mountain Daffodils were a British indie rock band formed in the late 1980s. They released three full-length albums, one EP and one single between 1987 and 1991.

Honolulu Mountain Daffodils were described by AllMusic as "A scatterbrained and perhaps drunken recording entity" and consisted of members likely all using pseudonyms: guitarist Joachim Pimento (Adrian Borland), guitarist-keyboardist Zoe Zettner, guitarist-vocalist Lord Sulaco, guitarist-percussionist Daiquiri J. Wright, guitarist Franklin Silverheels and bassist Smoky Alvaro.

Legacy 
The band have been cited as an influence on Spacemen 3's Peter Kember.

Discography 
 Studio albums

 Guitars of the Oceanic Undergrowth (1987, Hybrid Records)
 Tequila Dementia (1988, Zinger Records)
 Aloha Sayonara (1991, Mission Discs)

 EPs

 Psychic Hit-List Victims (1991, Mission Discs)

 Singles

 "Also Sprächt Scott Thurston" (1988, Area International)

 Compilation albums

 Guitars of the Oceanic Undergrowth/Tequila Dementia (1992, Mission Discs)

References 

British indie rock groups